Aposimz (stylized in all caps), known in Japan as , is a Japanese manga series written and illustrated by Tsutomu Nihei. It was serialized in Kodansha's shōnen manga magazine Monthly Shōnen Sirius from February 2017 to August 2021, with its chapters collected in nine tankōbon volumes.

Setting
Most of the planet's volume is occupied by its core, which is covered by a superstructural shell. Five thousand years ago, people who lost a war against the inhabitants of the core were exiled to the surface, a cold and harsh environment. Surface dwellers face both the rapidly-spreading , which slowly converts normal humans into biomechanical, zombie-like beings, and aggressive native biomechanical creatures known as automatons. Regular Frames are also able to assume an armored form and each one has a unique special ability or weapon. These Regular Frames are highly revered by normal humans and are often leaders and protectors in their communities.

Characters

The sole survivor of the  settlement after the  destroys it. After being transformed into a Regular Frame, he seeks revenge upon the Empire. His armored form is deep red in color and features a miniature railgun embedded in the left forearm known as an EBTG, which allows him to fire a variety of ammunition from his body's own solidified placenta to the incredibly powerful Anti-Megastructure Bullets.

An intelligent automaton who provides Etherow with the code that transforms him into a Regular Frame as well as seven Anti-Megastructure Bullets (AMBs). She journeys with Etherow as his guide and confidant. Her normal form is that of a small four-legged creature, but she is able to temporarily assume a humanoid form. However, this transformation consumes a large amount of energy and she is only able to change once daily.

Her armored form possesses a staff weapon that can extend to great lengths and is able to channel electricity.

A Regular Frame and former member of the Rebedoa Empire's  who joins Etherow's group. As a Regular Frame, Wasabu is capable of reinforcing himself in armor. He is able to fly and is able to kill anyone whose skin is exposed in the air.

Publication
Aposimz is written and illustrated by Tsutomu Nihei. Nihei published a one-shot in Kodansha's seinen manga magazine Weekly Young Magazine on May 9, 2016. In November 2016, it was announced that the manga would be serialized in Monthly Shōnen Sirius, being the first time that Nihei would publish a manga in a shōnen manga magazine. The series ran in the magazine from February 25, 2017, to August 26, 2021. Kodansha collected its chapters in nine tankōbon volumes, released from May 9, 2017, to December 9, 2021. Kodansha also started publishing a full-color edition of the series on November 8, 2019, and five volumes have been released as of August 8, 2022.

The manga was simultaneously published in English by ComiXology and Crunchyroll Manga. In November 2017, Vertical announced that they would release the series in print. The volumes were released from October 9, 2018, to June 28, 2022.

Volume list

Reception
As of February 2018, the manga had 250,000 copies in circulation.

References

Further reading

External links
 

Adventure anime and manga
Dark fantasy anime and manga
Kodansha manga
Science fiction anime and manga
Shōnen manga
Vertical (publisher) titles